Jack Blanchard & Misty Morgan were an American country music duo from Florida consisting of guitarist/keyboardist/vocalist Jack Blanchard (born May 8, 1942) and his wife, keyboardist/vocalist Misty Morgan (May 23, 1945 – January 1, 2021). The duo recorded for several labels in the 1970s, including the charting albums Birds of a Feather and Two Sides of Jack and Misty. Between 1969 and 1976, the duo also released fourteen singles, including "Tennessee Bird Walk", a Number One country hit and No. 23 pop hit in 1970.

Biography
Jack Blanchard was born on May 8, 1942, and Misty Morgan was born on May 23, 1945. Both were born in the same hospital in Buffalo, New York and lived in Ohio as children. They met in 1963 in Florida, where Blanchard was working as a comedian and Morgan as a pianist. They married in 1967. She was diagnosed with cancer in late December 2020 and died at age 75 on January 1, 2021.

Musical career
The two were already collaborating on 45s released by Miami's Zodiac label in 1965. In 1967, the now-married duo began playing music together, and, in 1969, signed to Wayside Records to release its first single, "Big Black Bird (Spirit of Our Love)", which peaked at No. 59 on the U.S. country singles charts. After it came the novelty song "Tennessee Bird Walk", which went to Number One on the country charts and No. 23 on the pop charts.  The duo followed-up with another novelty hit, "Humphrey the Camel", at No. 5 country and No. 78 pop.

The duo's second album, Two Sides of Jack and Misty, was released on Mega Records two years later. It produced four more chart singles, including the No. 15 "Somewhere in Virginia in the Rain" and another novelty song, "The Legendary Chicken Fairy". Later in the 1970s, Jack Blanchard & Misty Morgan released six singles on Epic Records, reaching Top 40 for the last time in 1974 with the No. 23 "Just One More Song". Except for a compilation album called Sweet Memories in 1987, the duo did not release any other material until 1995's Back in Harmony. From there, they began recording on a self-established independent label, "Velvet Saw Records" (named after Jack's nickname). From 2005 through 2008 they released three archival CD albums on Australia's Omni Records label.

Their song 'Yellow Bellied Sapsucker' was used in an episode of the third series of Australian television drama Tangle.

Discography
Birds of a Feather (Wayside Records, 1970) US No. 185, US Country No. 16
Two Sides of Jack and Misty (Mega Records, 1972) US Country No. 35
Sweet Memories (Chalice Records, 1987)
Back in Harmony (Playback Records, 1995)
Back from the Dead (BAM Records, 2000)
A Little Out of Sync (Velvet Saw Records, 2001)
Masters of the Keyboards (Velvet Saw, 2001)
Jack and Misty are Crazy (Velvet Saw, 2003)
Beginnings (Velvet Saw, 2004)
Back From the Dead, Vol. 2 (Velvet Saw)
Life and Death (and Almost Everything Else) (Omni Records, 2006)
Weird Scenes Inside the Birdhouse (Omni Records, 2007)
Nashville Sputnik the Deep South/Outer Space Productions of Jack Blanchard & Misty Morgan (Omni Records, 2008)
Traveling Music (Velvet Saw Records, 2009)
Just One More Song – The 2012 Recordings (Velvet Saw Records, 2012)

Singles

AB-side to "There Must Be More to Life (Than Growing Old)".

References

External links
http://jackandmisty.net The Jack Blanchard & Misty Morgan Official Home Page.
 
  Misty Morgan
  Jack Blanchard
 Entry at 45cat.com

Country music groups from Florida
Country music duos
Epic Records artists
Married couples
Mercury Records artists
Musical groups established in 1970
Musical groups disestablished in 2021
1970 establishments in Florida
2021 disestablishments in Florida
United Artists Records artists